States of matter are distinguished by changes in the properties of matter associated with external factors like pressure and temperature. States are usually distinguished by a discontinuity in one of those properties—for example, raising the temperature of ice produces a discontinuity in an increase in temperature. The three classical states of matter are  solid, liquid and gas. In the 20th century, however, increased understanding of the more exotic properties of matter resulted in the identification of many additional states of matter, none of which are observed in normal conditions.

Low-energy states of matter

Classical states
 Solid:  A solid holds a definite shape and volume without a container. The particles are held very close to each other.
Amorphous solid: A solid in which there is no far-range order of the positions of the atoms.
 Crystalline solid: A solid in which atoms, molecules, or ions are packed in regular order.
 Plastic crystal: A molecular solid with long-range positional order but with constituent molecules retaining rotational freedom.
 Quasicrystal: A solid in which the positions of the atoms have long-range order, but this is not in a repeating pattern.
 Liquid: A mostly non-compressible fluid. Able to conform to the shape of its container but retains a (nearly) constant volume independent of pressure.
Liquid crystal: Properties intermediate between liquids and crystals. Generally, able to flow like a liquid but exhibiting long-range order.
 Gas: A compressible fluid. Not only will a gas take the shape of its container but it will also expand to fill the container.

Modern states
 Plasma: Free charged particles, usually in equal numbers, such as ions and electrons. Unlike gases, plasma may self-generate magnetic fields and electric currents and respond strongly and collectively to electromagnetic forces. Plasma is very uncommon on Earth (except for the ionosphere), although it is the most common state of matter in the universe.
 Supercritical fluid: At sufficiently high temperatures and pressures, the distinction between liquid and gas disappears.
 Degenerate matter: matter under very high pressure, supported by the Pauli exclusion principle.
 Electron-degenerate matter: found inside white dwarf stars. Electrons remain bound to atoms but can transfer to adjacent atoms.
 Neutron-degenerate matter: found in neutron stars. Vast gravitational pressure compresses atoms so strongly that the electrons are forced to combine with protons via Inverse beta decay, resulting in a super dense conglomeration of neutrons. (Normally free neutrons outside an atomic nucleus will decay with a half-life of just under fifteen minutes, but in a neutron star, as in the nucleus of an atom, other effects stabilize the neutrons.)
 Strange matter: A type of quark matter that may exist inside some neutron stars close to the Tolman–Oppenheimer–Volkoff limit (approximately 2–3 solar masses). May be stable at lower energy states once formed.
Quantum spin Hall state: a theoretical phase that may pave the way for developing electronic devices that dissipate less energy and generate less heat. This is a derivation of the quantum Hall state of matter.
 Bose–Einstein condensate: a phase in which a large number of bosons all inhabit the same quantum state, in effect becoming one single wave/particle.  This is a low-energy phase that can only be formed in laboratory conditions and at very low temperatures. It must be close to zero kelvin, or absolute zero. Satyendra Nath Bose and Albert Einstein predicted the existence of such a state in the 1920s, but it was not observed until 1995 by Eric Cornell and Carl Wieman.
 Fermionic condensate: Similar to the Bose-Einstein condensate but composed of fermions, also known as Fermi-Dirac condensate. The Pauli exclusion principle prevents fermions from entering the same quantum state, but a pair of fermions can behave like a boson, and multiple such pairs can then enter the same quantum state without restriction.
 Superconductivity: is a phenomenon of exactly zero electrical resistance and expulsion of magnetic fields occurring in certain materials when cooled below a characteristic critical temperature. Superconductivity is the ground state of many elemental metals.
 Superfluid: A phase achieved by a few cryogenic liquids at extreme temperature at which they become able to flow without friction. A superfluid can flow up the side of an open container and down the outside. Placing a superfluid in a spinning container will result in quantized vortices.
 Supersolid: similar to a superfluid, a supersolid can move without friction but retains a rigid shape.
 Quantum spin liquid: A disordered state in a system of interacting quantum spins which preserves its disorder to shallow temperatures, unlike other disordered states.
 String-net liquid: Atoms in this state have unstable arrangements, like a liquid, but are still consistent in the overall pattern, like a solid.
 Time crystals: A state of matter where an object can have movement even at its lowest energy state.
 Rydberg polaron: A state of matter that can only exist at ultra-low temperatures and consists of atoms inside of atoms.

 Black superionic ice: A state of matter that can exist under very high pressure while excited by super lasers.

High energy states
 Quark–gluon plasma: A phase in which up-quarks and down-quarks become free and able to move independently (rather than being perpetually bound into particles, or bound to each other in a quantum lock where exerting force adds energy and eventually solidifies into another quark) in an ocean of gluons (subatomic particles that transmit the strong force that binds quarks together). May be briefly attainable in particle accelerators, or possibly inside neutron stars.
 For up to 10−35 seconds after the Big Bang, the energy density of the universe was so high that the four forces of nature – strong, weak, electromagnetic, and gravitational – are thought to have been unified into one single force. The state of matter at this time is unknown. As the universe expanded, the temperature and density dropped and the gravitational force separated, a process called symmetry breaking.

See also
 Electron quadruplets

References

 Physics-related lists
+

fr:Liste des états de la matière
it:Stati della materia
th:รายชื่อสถานะของสสาร